Jintasaurus (meaning "Jinta County dragon") is a genus of hadrosauriform dinosaur described by Hai-Lu You (尤海鲁, Yóu Hǎilǔ) and Da-Qing Li (李大庆, Lǐ Dàqìng) in 2009. The type species is J. meniscus. Jintasaurus lived during the Early Cretaceous of what is now Gansu, northwestern China. The fossils were discovered in Jinta County, Jiuquan, Gansu, China. The discovery supports the theory that hadrosaurs originated in Asia. The holotype and only known specimen includes the postorbital skull, lacking the jugal and quadratojugal.

References

Early Cretaceous dinosaurs of Asia
Iguanodonts
Fossil taxa described in 2009
Paleontology in Gansu
Ornithischian genera